Lee Da-bin (born August 1, 1996), better known by her stage name Yeonwoo, is a South Korean singer and actress managed by 9ato Entertainment. She is best known as a former member of the girl group Momoland. Yeonwoo has acted in television dramas, including Pegasus Market (2019), Touch (2020), and Cheat on Me If You Can (2020).

Early life
Yeonwoo was born on August 1, 1996, in Chungju, North Chungcheong Province, South Korea. She attended School of Performing Arts Seoul.

Career

2016–2019: Finding Momoland and debut with Momoland

In 2016, Yeonwoo became a contestant on Mnet's reality survival show Finding Momoland to select the members of MLD Entertainment's new girl group Momoland. She finished the competition in fifth place and officially debuted in Momoland on November 10, 2016, with the mini-album Welcome to Momoland. Yeonwoo departed from Momoland in November 2019.

2022–present: Acting career
On January 19, 2022, it was confirmed that Yeonwoo signed an exclusive contract with 9ato Entertainment.

Discography

Filmography

Television series

Web series

Television shows

Awards and nominations

References

External links

 

1996 births
Living people
South Korean female idols
South Korean women pop singers
South Korean dance musicians
South Korean television actresses
South Korean television presenters
South Korean women television presenters
People from Chungju
21st-century South Korean actresses
21st-century South Korean women singers
School of Performing Arts Seoul alumni
Momoland members